"I Believe" is a song by British band EMF, released as the second single from their first album, Schubert Dip (1991). The song was released as a single in January 1991 in the UK following their big hit "Unbelievable". The song reached number six on the UK Singles Chart. In the US, the song was the band's third single following "Lies" as the second. It reached number ten on the US Billboard Modern Rock chart. The accompanying music video received heavy rotation on MTV Europe.

The song includes the sound of band member Derry Brownson smashing a wall - on the album version, the band can be heard laughing at Brownson for trashing the flat at the beginning of the song.

Track listings
 UK CD (CDR 6279)
 "I Believe" – 3:16
 "I Believe" (Dean Age Rampage Mix) – 6:31
 "When You're Mine" – 4:10
 "Unbelievable" (Funk Mix) – 5:14

 UK 7" (R 6279)
 "I Believe" – 3:16
 "When You're Mine" – 4:10

 UK 12" (12R 6279)
 "I Believe" (Dean Age Rampage Mix)
 "Unbelievable" (Funk Mix)
 "When You're Mine"

 UK Remix 12" (12RX 6279)
 "I Believe" (Colt 45 Mix) – 8:19
 "I Believe" (Inframental Mix) – 6:38

References

1991 singles
EMF (band) songs
Parlophone singles
1991 songs